Koli is a surname, and may refer to:

 Bahadur Singh Koli (born 1961), Indian politician
 Dharmender Singh Koli
 Ganga Ram Koli (born 1937), Indian politician
 Johnson Koli (born 1953), Solomon Islands politician
 Ousman Koli
 Ramswaroop Koli
 Ranjeeta Koli   
 Surender Koli

See also

 Kali (name)
 Koli (disambiguation)